Dogs Act (with its variations) is a stock short title used in the United Kingdom for legislation relating to dogs.

List
The Dogs Act 1871
The Dogs Act 1906 (6 Edw 7 c 32)
The Dogs (Amendment) Act 1928 (18 & 19 Geo 5 c 21)
The Dogs Amendment Act 1938 (1 & 2 Geo 6 c 21)
The Dogs (Protection of Livestock) Act 1953 (1 & 2 Eliz 2 c 28)
The Dogs (Fouling of Land) Act 1996
The Dangerous Dogs Act 1989
The Dangerous Dogs Act 1991
The Dangerous Dogs (Amendment) Act 1997
The Guard Dogs Act 1975
The Breeding of Dogs Act 1973
The Breeding of Dogs Act 1991
The Breeding and Sale of Dogs (Welfare) Act 1999
The Anti-social Behaviour, Crime and Policing Act 2014 which covers criminal penalties related to acts with dogs

Acts of the Northern Ireland Assembly

The Dogs (Amendment) Act (Northern Ireland) 2001

Acts of the Scottish Parliament

The Dog Fouling (Scotland) Act 2003
The Control of Dogs (Scotland) Act 2010

See also
 List of short titles
 Dog licence

Lists of legislation by short title